Open Mind (foaled 1986 – died 1998) was an American Thoroughbred racing filly.  In 1988, she won the Eclipse Award for American Champion Two-Year-Old Filly.  In 1989, she won the award as American Champion Three-Year-Old Filly.  In her third year, she also won the American Triple Tiara of Thoroughbred Racing.

Open Mind (chestnut filly, by Deputy Minister out of Stage Lucky, by Stage Door Johnny), was bred in New Jersey by Due Process Stables. She won 12 of her 19 career starts. Owned by Eugene V. Klein and trained by Hall of Famer D. Wayne Lukas, Open Mind was named champion 2-year-old filly of 1988 when she won four of six starts, including the Grade I Breeders' Cup Juvenile Fillies with Ángel Cordero Jr. in the stirrups.

At age three, Open Mind won eight of her 11 starts, including the New York Filly Triple Crown (the Acorn Stakes, the Mother Goose Stakes, and the Coaching Club American Oaks).  Each of these were Grade I events.  That year, she also won the Kentucky Oaks and the Alabama Stakes. Her victory in the Alabama Stakes was her 10th consecutive win, seven of which came in grade I races.

Open Mind died in Japan in 1998.

Pedigree

References

YouTube video – 1989 Pimlico Oaks Open Mind
YouTube video – Open Mind – 1988 Breeders Cup Juvenile Fillies

1986 racehorse births
1998 racehorse deaths
Racehorses trained in the United States
Breeders' Cup Juvenile Fillies winners
Kentucky Oaks winners
Eclipse Award winners
United States Thoroughbred Racing Hall of Fame inductees
Thoroughbred family A29
Racehorses bred in New Jersey